Ojan may refer to:
Bostanabad
Owjan, South Khorasan